Alessandro Barbieri (1850 – September 26, 1931) was an Italian painter born in Milan.

He trained under Giuseppe Bertini and Tranquillo Cremona at the Accademia di Brera, painting genre themes. He exhibited four paintings in the Mostra Veneziana of 1887: 
Dolorose rimembranze
Madre felice
In sacrestia
La cresima

References

1850 births
1931 deaths
19th-century Italian painters
Italian male painters
20th-century Italian painters
Painters from Milan
19th-century Italian male artists
20th-century Italian male artists